Carmen Ionesco (birth name Carmen Ionescu; born July 28, 1951 in Bucharest, Romania) is a retired female discus thrower and shot putter, who competed for Romania and Canada at the Summer Olympics.

She represented Romania in her first Olympic appearance, at Munich in 1972. Following her emigration to Canada, Ionesco competed for Canada at two Commonwealth Games (1978 and 1982), the 1979 Pan American Games, and the 1984 Summer Olympic Games in Los Angeles.

Her younger sister Florența competed for Romania in the 1980 and 1984 Summer Olympics.

Achievements

References

 
 

Canadian female discus throwers
Canadian female shot putters
Romanian female discus throwers
Athletes (track and field) at the 1979 Pan American Games
Athletes (track and field) at the 1978 Commonwealth Games
Athletes (track and field) at the 1982 Commonwealth Games
Athletes (track and field) at the 1972 Summer Olympics
Athletes (track and field) at the 1984 Summer Olympics
Olympic track and field athletes of Canada
Olympic athletes of Romania
Pan American Games bronze medalists for Canada
Commonwealth Games gold medallists for Canada
Commonwealth Games silver medallists for Canada
Commonwealth Games medallists in athletics
Sportspeople from Bucharest
Romanian emigrants to Canada
Pan American Games medalists in athletics (track and field)
1951 births
Living people
Medalists at the 1979 Pan American Games
Medallists at the 1978 Commonwealth Games